Project for Awesome (often abbreviated P4A) is a community-driven charitable movement on YouTube, created by the Green brothers, Hank and John, run through their VlogBrothers YouTube channel and through their online community known as Nerdfighteria. Formerly dubbed the Nerdfighter Power Project for Awesome, the project has taken place annually since 2007. The movement was started to have YouTubers create innovative videos promoting their favorite charity and upload it by a certain deadline, with the aim that their promoted charity gains more awareness, and donations from audiences.

The event lasts for 48 hours. From 2007 to 2019, the P4A took place in December, but in 2020 it was announced that the event would be moved to February moving forward.

Background
The Foundation to Decrease World Suck is a non-profit corporation, based in Montana. It is designated as a 501(c)(3). The Foundation is the Project for Awesome's parent organization. The Foundation was informally established on March 6, 2007, by Hank Green of the VlogBrothers, during the Brotherhood 2.0 Project. However, it was incorporated as a non-profit corporation in the State of Montana in November 2011. The IRS then designated the Foundation with 501(c)(3) status on January 23, 2013. The Foundation is governed by a seven member board of directors.

History
In 2007, over 400 videos were posted, which promoted charities including UNICEF, Autism Speaks, and Toys for Tots. The 2007 Project was successful to the point where a large majority of videos, all having the same P4A thumbnail, on the front page were related to the cause. The Greens were able to accomplish this feat with the collaborative efforts of the community that follows their videos, Nerdfighteria, while also "sort of" hacking YouTube's algorithm. Reflecting on the event, Hank Green states, "YouTube was sort of a weird place that was fairly easy to sort of game the algorithms. And the way that the thumbnails worked and all of the different lists were important for getting views," adding, "it was sort of frowned upon to game the system, but we thought, 'What if we gamed the system for good?'" The 2007 Project was documented to be a success, one that the Greens hoped, and accomplished, to emulate over the following years, by uniting their community.

In 2013, an Indiegogo Campaign ran raising $721,696 for the campaign. The total resulted in the campaign becoming the most funded Video / Web Campaign in Indiegogo history. In 2013, a final total of $869,591 was raised. As the Project for Awesome continued to grow in size, the Greens implemented a perk system on the Project's Indiegogo fundraising page. An example of a perk would be the 2014 project's, An Imperial Affliction, a prop novel read in The Fault in Our Stars. Throughout the history of the project, the Greens have hosted a coinciding 48-hour livestream event. Prior to the 2014 project, John stated, "Our goal is to find a way to raise $1 million," adding, "That's what we really hope will happen." Following the 2019 campaign, Hank Green announced on Twitter that the Young Democrats of America passed a resolution honoring the work of the P4A. 

After 2019, the Project for Awesome was moved from December to February. The event was not held in 2020, with the 2021 event scheduled for Presidents' Day weekend in February 2021. The 2021 Project for Awesome earned more in crowdfunded donations than any other year up to that point, totalling $1,490,012, reaching one million dollars in donations via Tiltify in under 36 hours. The subsequent year's project was the first to pass the $3 million mark.

Yearly earnings

References

Projects established in 2007
Articles containing video clips
Charity fundraisers
Works by the Green brothers
Internet-based activism
Internet culture
YouTube